The Philosophical Gourmet Report (also known as the Leiter Report or PGR), founded by philosophy and law professor Brian Leiter and now edited by philosophy professors Berit Brogaard and Christopher Pynes, is a ranking of graduate programs in philosophy in the English-speaking world.

Background
The "Gourmet" Report ranking was created in response to the Gourman Report, and is based on a survey of philosophers who are nominated as evaluators by the Report's Advisory Board. Its purpose is to provide guidance to prospective Ph.D students, particularly those students who intend to pursue a professional career in academic philosophy. The Report first appeared on the web in 1996; it is currently published and distributed by Blackwell.

In 1989, while he was a graduate student, Leiter made a subjective list of what he believed to be the top 25 graduate philosophy programs in the United States, which came to be the PGR.   The PGR was described by David L. Kirp in a 2003 New York Times op-ed as "the bible for prospective [philosophy] graduate students."  Carlin Romano, in America the Philosophical (Knopf Doubleday Publishing Group, 2013), referred to the PGR rankings as "often-criticized" and "biased towards mainstream analytic departments".

In 2002, 175 philosophers signed an open letter calling on Leiter to stop producing the PGR. In fall 2014, over 600 philosophers signed a petition to boycott the PGR. The petition was organized by some philosophers at University of British Columbia to protest what they called a "derogatory and intimidating" e-mail sent by Leiter to one of their colleagues. Leiter claimed the recipient had threatened him. 24 of the 56 members of the Advisory Board of the PGR recommended he relinquish control over the Report's management. In response, Leiter appointed Berit Brogaard, a philosophy professor at the University of Miami, as co-editor for the 2014 report and agreed to step down as editor of subsequent editions. Leiter subsequently appointed Christopher Pynes of Western Illinois University as co-editor of future editions.

Overall ranking worldwide (top 30)

See also
 College and university rankings

References

External links
 The Philosophical Gourmet Report

Philosophy education
Philosophical literature
Philosophy websites
University and college rankings